Meine Welt ("My World") is the first album by the German singer Yvonne Catterfeld, released by Hansa Records and BMG on 26 May 2003.

Track listing

Charts

Weekly charts

Year-end charts

Release history

References

External links
 YvonneCatterfeld.com — official website

2003 debut albums
Yvonne Catterfeld albums